My Kitchen Rules NZ (series 3) is a reality television cooking programme which aired on TVNZ 2.

It premiered September 25, with new hosts and judges, Pete Evans and Manu Feildel. Unlike previous seasons, and specific only to the NZ edition, only 6 teams went head-to-head in a single round instant restaurants (and no second round of double dish for each course), before competing in a series of elimination challenges, shortening the season by half.

Format Changes
Teams – Only 6 teams were involved in the competition. In the past, at least 12 teams have competed in the competition.
Special Guest Judges – Special celebrity guest judges have appeared alongside the main judging panel and competing teams for the Sudden Death Cook-offs.

Teams

Elimination History

Competition Details

Instant Restaurants 
 Episodes 1 to 6
 Airdate – 25 Sept to 30 Oct 2017
 Description – Teams were to transform their homes into an 'Instant Restaurant', serving opposing teams and judges a three course meal (Entrée , Main and Dessert). All teams are judged and scored by the other teams, and also by Pete and Manu.

Sudden Death

Sudden Death Cook-off 1
 Episode 7
 Airdate – 6 Nov 2017
 Description – CB: Chris & Bex (WKA) VS (ROT) TH: Tash & Hera. Cooking simultaneously in the same commercial kitchen, they are to prepare a multi-course meal to the judges, remaining contestants and special guests: Present and former cast members of Shortland Street, with the losing team to be eliminated on the spot.

Sudden Death Cook-off 2
 Episode 8
 Airdate – 13 Nov 2017
 Description – JB: Jaryd & Ben (AUK) VS (CHC) HM: Heather & Mitch. They are to prepare a multi-course meal to the judges, remaining contestants and special guests: New Zealand sports stars, with the losing team to be eliminated on the spot.

Semi-final 

 Episode 9
 Airdate – 20 Nov 2017
 Description – All three remaining teams compete. They are to prepare a three-course banquet in Orakei Bay to the judges, remaining contestants and 80 guests: Newly-weds and their families, with the losing team to be eliminated on the spot. The three courses are Canapé, Entrée  and Main as the Dessert is provided by the bride's family, which includes the wedding cake.

Grand Final 

 Episode 10
 Airdate – 27 Nov 2017
 Description – CB: Chris & Bex (WKA) VS (CHC) HM: Heather & Mitch. They are to prepare a four-course meal (Entrée, Fish Main, Meat Main and Dessert) in Gusto at The Grand to the judges, remaining contestants and special guests (totalling 20 guests):Luminaries of NZ Chefs and Food Critics, including Ray McVinnie, chef, gastronomy lecturer in AUT, and former judge of MasterChef NZ seasons 1-3 , Nadia Lim, the winner of Master Chef NZ season 2, dietitian and founder of My Food Bag, Sean Connelly, the head chef of Gusto and The Grill, with the winning team being crowned My Kitchen Rules NZ 2017 champions.

Episodes
 Colour Key:
  – Elimination Episode
  – Finals Week

References

External links
 Official site

2017 New Zealand television seasons
My Kitchen Rules